The International Consortium of Investigative Journalists, Inc. (ICIJ), is an independent global network of 280 investigative journalists and over 140 media organizations spanning more than 100 countries. It is based in Washington, D.C. with personnel in Australia, France, Spain, Hungary, Serbia, Belgium and Ireland.

The ICIJ was launched in 1997 by American journalist Charles Lewis as an initiative of the Center for Public Integrity, with the aim of exposing international crime and corruption. In 2017, it became a fully independent organization and was later granted 501(c)(3) nonprofit status.

The Panama Papers were the result of a collaboration with the German newspaper  and more than 100 other media partners, with journalists spending a year sifting through 11.5 million leaked files from the Panama-based law firm Mossack Fonseca. It culminated in a partial release on 3 April 2016, garnering global media attention. The set of confidential financial and legal documents included detailed information on more than 14,000 clients and more than 214,000 offshore entities, revealing the identities of shareholders and directors including noted personalities and heads of state— government officials, close relatives and associates of various heads of government of more than 40 other countries.  first received the released data from an anonymous source in 2015. After working on the Mossack Fonseca documents for a year, ICIJ director Gerard Ryle described how the offshore firm had "helped companies and individuals with tax havens, including those that have been sanctioned by the U.S. and UK for dealing with Syrian President Bashar al-Assad."

The ICIJ helped bring about the Corporate Transparency Act in the United States. The Enablers Act, included in the annual defense bill, was first proposed shortly after ICIJ's Pandora Papers investigation exposed widespread exploitation of lax financial disclosure rules in the U.S.

Governments have recovered more than US$1.36 billion in taxes as a result of the Panama Papers project alone, and some continue to collect lost tax revenue.

History
In 1997, the Center for Public Integrity began creating the consortium. By 2000, the ICIJ consisted of 75 investigative reporters in 39 countries."

In early November 2014, the ICIJ's Luxembourg Leaks investigation revealed that Luxembourg under Jean-Claude Juncker's premiership had turned into a major European centre of corporate tax avoidance.

In February 2015, the ICIJ website released information about bank accounts in Switzerland under the title Swiss Leaks: Murky Cash Sheltered by Bank Secrecy, which published information on 100,000 clients and their accounts at HSBC.

In February 2017, ICIJ was spun off into a fully independent organisation, which is governed by three committees: a board of directors, an Advisory Committee, and the ICIJ Network Committee.

ICIJ was granted nonprofit status from US tax authorities in July 2017.

In 2017, the ICIJ, the McClatchy Company, and the Miami Herald won the Pulitzer Prize for Explanatory Reporting for the Panama Papers. In total, the ICIJ won more than 20 awards for the Panama Papers.

Selected reports

Global tobacco industry
From 2008 to 2011, the ICIJ investigated the global tobacco industry, revealing how Philip Morris International and other tobacco companies worked to grow businesses in Russia, Mexico, Uruguay and Indonesia.

Offshore banking series
The ICIJ partnered with The Guardian, BBC, Le Monde, the Washington Post, SonntagsZeitung, The Indian Express, Süddeutsche Zeitung and NDR to produce an investigative series on offshore banking. They reported on government corruption across the globe, tax avoidance schemes used by wealthy people and the use of secret offshore accounts in Ponzi Schemes.

In June 2011, an ICIJ article revealed how an Australian businessman had helped his clients legally incorporate thousands of offshore shell entitles "some of which later became involved in the international movement of oil, guns and money."

In April 2013, a report (Offshore Leaks) disclosing details of 130,000 offshore accounts, some of which conducted international tax fraud.

In early 2014, the ICIJ revealed that relatives of China's political and financial elite were among those using offshore tax havens to conceal wealth. In July 2019, the Mauritius Leaks showed how Mauritius was being used as one such tax haven.

In January 2020, Luanda Leaks revealed how Angola's richest woman, Isabel dos Santos, used a network of Western advisors to amass a fortune. The investigation showed how dos Santos and her husband, Sindika Dokolo, built their empire taking advantage of many secrecy jurisdictions.

Panama Papers

The Süddeutsche Zeitung received a leaked set of 11.5 million confidential documents from a secret source, created by the Panamanian corporate service provider Mossack Fonseca. The so-called Panama Papers provided detailed information on more than 214,000 offshore companies, including the identities of shareholders and directors which included government officials, close relatives and close associates of various heads of government of more than 40 countries. Because of the leak the prime minister of Iceland, Sigmundur David Gunnlaugsson, was forced to resign on 5 April 2016. By 4 April 2016 more than 100 media organisations had participated in analyzing the documents, including BBC Panorama, and the UK newspaper, The Guardian. Based on the Panama Paper disclosure, Pakistan Supreme Court constituted the Joint Investigation Team to probe the matter and disqualified the Prime Minister Nawas Sharif on 28 July 2017 to hold any public office for life.

The ICIJ and  received the Panama Papers in 2015 and distributed them to about 400 journalists at 107 media organizations in more than 80 countries.

According to The New York Times,

Paradise Papers

In 2017, the German newspaper Süddeutsche Zeitung obtained millions of leaked files known as the Paradise Papers, regarding tax havens, related to the Bermuda-based offshore specialist Appleby. The files were shared the ICIJ and later the media. They revealed that many of the tax havens used by Appleby are in the Cayman Islands.

Pandora Papers 

On October 3, 2021, the ICIJ began publishing 11.9 million leaked documents (comprising 2.9 terabytes of data) that came to be known as the Pandora Papers. The ICIJ described the document leak as their most expansive exposé of financial secrecy yet, containing documents, images, emails and spreadsheets from 14 financial service companies, in nations including Panama, Switzerland and the UAE, surpassing their previous release of the Panama Papers in 2016, which had 11.5 million confidential documents.

In total, the ICIJ won nine awards for the Pandora Papers including the Overseas Press Club of America's Malcolm Forbes Award for international business reporting and the WAN-IFRA North American Digital Media Award.

Implant Files 
In November 2018, the ICIJ published the Implant Files, the first global investigation into the medical device industry that tracked the harm caused by medical devices that have been tested inadequately or not at all. It took a year to plan and another year to complete.

ICIJ partnered with 252 journalists from 59 media organisations in 36 countries to examine how devices are tested, approved, marketed and monitored. Anchoring the probe was an analysis of more than 8 million device-related health records, including death and injury reports and recalls. In total, the ICIJ won 11 awards for the Implant Files.

Mauritius Leaks 

In July 2019, the ICIJ published the Mauritius Leaks, a datajournalistic investigation about how the former British colony Mauritius has transformed itself into a financial centre and tax haven. A whistleblower leaked documents from a law firm in Mauritius to the ICIJ, providing insight in how multinational companies avoid paying taxes when they do business in Africa, the Middle East, and Asia.

China Cables 

In November 2019, the ICIJ revealed classified Chinese government documents leaked by exiled Uighurs, dubbed the China Cables which prove mass surveillance and internment camps of Uighurs and other Muslim minorities in China's Xinjiang province.

FinCEN Files 

In September 2020, the ICIJ along with BuzzFeed News published leaked documents from the Financial Crimes Enforcement Network (FinCEN) that describe suspicious financial transactions across multiple global financial institutions.

Ericsson List 
In February 2022, the ICIJ published the Ericsson List, an internal investigation into corruption inside the Swedish multinational networking and telecommunications company Ericsson. It detailed corruption in at least 10 countries. Ericsson has admitted "serious breaches of compliance rules".

Uber Files 

In July 2022, the ICIJ published the Uber Files, a leaked database of Uber's activities in about 40 countries from 2013 to 2017. The documents were leaked to The Guardian, and shared with the ICIJ and a number of media organisations.

Data journalism 
In the course of the Panama Papers and Paradise Papers investigations, ICIJ was challenged to learn about and implement various technologies to manage international collaboration on terabytes of data – structured and unstructured (e.g. emails, PDFs) – and how to extract meaningful information from this data. Among the technologies used were the Neo4j graph database management system and Linkurious to search and visualize the data. The data-intensive projects involved not just veteran investigative journalists, but also demanded data journalists and programmers.

ICIJ's research platform is called Datashare. It is free and open source. Datashare was developed by ICIJ together with Swiss university École Polytechnique Fédérale de Lausanne. In 2021, Datashare was improved to make 11.9 million records (2.9 terabytes) available to more than 600 journalists. Also in 2021, the ICIJ's technology team built a new open-source platform, Prophecies, to make data fact-checking more efficient.

ICIJ's public Offshore Leaks Database a repository of information on companies registered in tax havens. It uses machine-learning techniques to analyze data. The ICIJ also provides advice on the use of other public databases, as well as research assistance to partner journalists.

Collaborative journalism 
The ICIJ's collaborative journalism model has been described as a new departure for global journalism that embraces collaboration. ICIJ's cross-border collaboration, involves more than 140 newspapers, television and radio stations, and online media organizations, and is marked by transparency and peer scrutiny. The stories that result from the collaboration are published simultaneously around the world and made available to readers free.

The ICIJ is funded entirely by donations.

Awards and recognition
ICIJ's collaborations have received several awards, including the 2017 Pulitzer Prize for Explanatory Reporting.  Their work to uncover financial secrecy was nominated for the 2021 Nobel Peace Prize. In 2021, the ICIJ also won a News Emmy along with PBS Frontline for its Luanda Leaks investigation and was named a Pulitzer Prize finalist for the FinCEN Files.

In 2022, the ICIJ was awarded the Katharine Graham Award for courage and accountability by the White House Correspondents’ Association. ICIJ also received an Honourable Mention award at the 2022 Allard Prize for International Integrity.

The ICIJ organized the bi-annual Daniel Pearl Awards for Outstanding International Investigative Reporting. The award is currently not being awarded.

GuideStar, a nonprofits evaluator, gave the ICIJ a "Gold Seal of Transparency" in 2019.

See also 
 European Investigative Collaborations
 Center for Public Integrity (United States)

References

External links 
 

News agencies based in the United States
Online person databases
Organizations established in 1997
Organizations based in Washington, D.C.
News leaks
1997 establishments in Washington, D.C.
Offshoring
Paradise Papers
Panama Papers
Pandora Papers
Pulitzer Prize for Explanatory Journalism winners
International Consortium of Investigative Journalists
Investigative journalism